László Varga (born 7 April 1953) is a Hungarian weightlifter. He competed in the men's heavyweight I event at the 1980 Summer Olympics.

References

External links
 

1953 births
Living people
Hungarian male weightlifters
Olympic weightlifters of Hungary
Weightlifters at the 1980 Summer Olympics
People from Tét
Sportspeople from Győr-Moson-Sopron County